KFUM Nässjö is an YMCA association in Nässjö, Sweden. The club has played in the men's Swedish top division, and was established in 1939.

Notable players

References

External links
Official website 

1939 establishments in Sweden
Sport in Jönköping County
Basketball teams in Sweden
Nass